Lorin Latarro  is a Broadway Director/Choreographer whose work has been seen on Broadway and in dance companies internationally. She began her career as a dancer who performed in fourteen Broadway shows and toured with world renowned dance companies.

Life and career 
She graduated from the Juilliard School where she trained under Benjamin Harkarvy. She also trained with Pina Bausch, Hector Zaraspe and Jirí Kylián. After earning her Bachelor of Fine Arts at Juilliard, Latarro danced for the Martha Graham Dance Company and later with MOMIX and Twyla Tharp. She performed in 14 Broadway shows including Fosse, Movin' Out, A Chorus Line, Spamalot, and Swing!.

Latarro is now a Director/Choreographer in New York City whose credits include Broadway's “Into The Woods”, "Waitress", “Mrs. Doubtfire”, "Les Liaisons Dangereuses", Waiting for Godot, The Metropolitan Opera's La Traviata,This American Life: 21 Chump Street for Ira Glass and Lin-Manuel Miranda, Public Theater's The Odyssey' and Twelfth Night', BAM's Peter and The Wolf, Queen Of The Night (Drama Desk Award), Encores! Fanny (2010), Kiss Me Kate, and Curious Incident of The Dog In The Night-Time, American Idiot and more. She is the Artistic Associate at The Bucks County Playhouse

Lorin is currently developing Lauren Sandler’s novel This Is All I Got with playwright Kirsten Greenidge into a musical about a homeless woman in NYC and her plight to find a stable housing for herself and her newborn son.  Lorin recently directed Candace Bushnell’s one woman show, IS THERE STILL SEX IN THE CITY at the Daryl Roth Theatre, which became a NYTimes Critic’s Pick.  

Additional Directing credits HITCHHIKERS GUIDE TO THE GALAXY-The Immersive Experience, QUEEN OF THE NIGHT which garnered a Drama Desk Award, The David Foster and Kat McPhee Show, #DATEME at The Westside Theatre, A TASTE OF THINGS TO COME at Chicago’s Nederlander Broadway, SWELLING AND IRRITATION by Jodi Picoult and Tim McDonald, TRAILS by Jeff Thompson, Christy Hall. RODGERS AFTER HAMMERSTEIN – 92Y Lyrics and Lyricists, Beth Malone’s THREE PART HARMONY- Theatre Aspen.

Latarro choreographed Broadway’s recent INTO THE WOODS, WAITRESS, MRS. DOUBTFIRE, LES LIASONS DANGEREUSE with Janet McTeer and Live Schreiber, WAITING FOR GODOT with Sir Ian McKellen and Sir Patrick Stuart, MERRILY WE ROLL ALONG at Roundabout, ASSASSINS at Encores, and LA TRAVIATA at The Met Opera, CHESS at The Kennedy Center, Lin-Manuel Miranda’s 21 CHUMP STREET for “This American Life” (Brooklyn Academy of Music), The Public Theater’s THE VISITOR, TWELFTH NIGHT and THE ODYSSEY (Public Works, Delacorte Theater), FANNY, and GOD BLESS YOU, MR. ROSEWATER (City Center Encores!), and A CHRISTMAS CAROL (McCarter Theatre). 

Ms. Latarro holds a BFA from The Juilliard School where she is an adjunct professor. She holds a secondary degree from NYU Tisch Film and Television Directing Fundamentals. She is a Drama Desk, Lortel, and Chita Rivera nominee. Lorin has traveled to India and Africa multiple times to work with The Gates Foundation in family health and planning and is the founder of ArtAmmmo.org Artists Against Gun Violence as seen in the NY Times, PBS, Rachel Maddow, BBC. 

LORINLATARRO.COM for reels and reviews

In addition to Latarro’s choreographic successes, she also works with the Gates Foundation on missions in Africa and is the founder of artammo.org. ART = AMMO, Artists Against Gun Violence. Latarro brings performance flash mobs to different areas of the country to encourage people to stop and truly think about their stance on gun violence in the United States.

 Stage productions 

Dance Companies:
 Juilliard Dance Ensemble
 Martha Graham Dance Company
 MOMIX
 Tharp!

Broadway:
 Swing! – Lead Lyndy Hop
 Fosse – featured role
 Kiss Me, Kate – Bianca u/s
 Man of La Mancha – Fermina
 Wonderful Town – Ensemble
 Movin' Out — Brenda
 Spamalot – Ensemble
 A Chorus Line — Cassie /Sheila/ Diana/ Vicki
 The Apple Tree – Nadjira, Dance Captain
 Grease you're the one that I want – NBC television 2007 – Associate Choreographer
 Curtains – 2008 – Bambi
 Guys and Dolls – Adelaide
 American Idiot – Associate Choreographer and Dance Captain, Director Michael Mayer
 How To Succeed In Business Without Trying – Ensemble
 Hands On A Hard Body – Associate Choreographer, Director Neil Pepe
 Scandalous – Choreographer, Director David Armstrong
 Waiting for Godot – Choreographer
 Curious Incident Of The Dog In The Night-Time – Associate Choreographer, Director Marianne Elliot
  Waitress – Choreographer, Director Diane Paulus

Lincoln Center:
 Company – PBS Live From Lincoln Center
 Hansel and Gretel – PBS Live From Lincoln Center
 Bessie Shoenberg Dance – PBS Live From Lincoln Center
 Rigoletto – The Metropolitan Opera – Associate Choreographer, Director Michael Mayer
 La traviata – The Metropolitan Opera – Choreographer. Produced by Michael Mayer. Available as an HD streaming video at Met Opera on Demand.

Other
 2020 The Visitor at the Public Theater
2020 La Traviata at the Metropolitan Opera 
2019 Waitress Tour
2019 Waitress London The West End
2019 The Outsiders at the Goodman Theatre
2019 Mrs. Doubtfire at Seattle's 5th Avenue Theatre
2019 Almost Famous at the Old Globe Theatre
2019 Guys and Dolls directed by Gordon Greenberg at The Muny
2019 Superhero at Second Stage Theater
2019 Merrily We Roll Along Roundabout Theatre Fiasco Theatre
2018 The Heart of Rock and Roll directed by Gordon Greenberg at the Old Globe Theatre
2011 Tomorrow Morning by Laurence Mark Wythe Theatre at St Peters, Lexington Avenue - York Theatre Company.
 2011 The Best Is Yet To Come – 59 E 59th, New York City – 2012 Drama Desk Award, Outstanding Revue; Choreographer, Director David Zippel
 2012 City Club, Minetta Lane Theatre, Choreographer
 2013 Queen Of The Night – Diamond Horseshoe Club, Paramount Hotel; 2015 Drama Desk Award, Unique Theatrical Experience; Choreographer, Director Christine Jones
 2014 21 Chump Street – BAM, Choreographer, Director Michael Mayer
 2014 Jasper In Deadland – Prospect Theater Company, New York City, Choreographer, Director Brandon Ivie
 2014 Peter And The Wolf – BAM, Choreographer, Director Annette Jolles
 2015 The Odyssey – The Public Theatre, Delacorte Theater, Choreographer, Director Lear DeBessonet
2015 Beaches, Drury Lane Theatre, Chicago, Illinois – Choreographer, Director Eric Shaeffer
 Hugh Jackman's Broadway – Wynn Hotel
 2016 God Bless You, Mr. Rosewater – Encores!, Choreographer, Director Michael Mayer
 2016 Twelfth Night'' – The Public Theatre, Delacorte Theater, Choreographer, Director Kwame Kwei-Armah

Press 

How the Women of Waitress Are Changing Broadway Behind the Scenes - TIME, April 19, 2016

BWW Interview: Choreographer Lorin Latarro on Creating the Dances for Broadway's WAITRESS - Broadway World, February 24, 2016

How Skipping School Kick-Started a Career for Waitress Choreographer Lorin Latarro - Broadway.com, April 13, 2016

Broadway Time Machine: Waitress Choreographer Lorin Latarro Talks 5 Game-Changing Shows - Broadway Box, April 21, 2016

SWEET SUCCESS: AN INTERVIEW WITH “WAITRESS” CHOREOGRAPHER LORIN LATARRO - Master Chat, April 20, 2016

What 'Waitress' Choreographer Lorin Latarro Wants Dancers to Know - backstage, August 3, 2016

Broadway-Bound Musical ‘Waitress’ Makes History With All Female Creative Team — a Talk With Choreographer Lorin Latarro - The Huffington Post, March 23, 2016

Opening Up with Lorin Latarro - The Broadway Blogger, August 8, 2016

Flash Mob in Times Square Honors Victims of Newtown - NYTimes, February 24, 2013

References

External links
 
 

Living people
American choreographers
American female dancers
20th-century American dancers
Year of birth missing (living people)
Juilliard School alumni
American women choreographers
20th-century American women
21st-century American women